Lilli Palmer (born Lilli Marie Peiser; 24 May 1914 – 27 January 1986) was a German actress and writer. After beginning her career in British films in the 1930s, she would later transition to major Hollywood productions, earning a Golden Globe Award nomination for her performance in But Not for Me (1959).

Other notable roles include in the comedy The Pleasure of His Company (1961), the Spanish horror film The House That Screamed (1969), and in the miniseries Peter the Great (1986), which earned her another Golden Globe Award nomination. For her career in European films, Palmer won the Volpi Cup, and the Deutscher Filmpreis three times.

Early life

When Lilli was four her family moved to Berlin-Charlottenburg. She was a junior table tennis champion as a young girl.

Career
In France, she appeared in an operetta at the Moulin Rouge, and then to London, where she began her film career. While performing in cabarets, she attracted the attention of British talent scouts and was offered a contract by the Gaumont Film Company. She made her screen debut in Crime Unlimited (1935) and appeared in numerous British films for the next decade.

She married actor Rex Harrison on 25 January 1943, and followed him to Hollywood in 1945. She signed with Warner Brothers and appeared in several films, notably Cloak and Dagger (1946) and Body and Soul (1947).

She periodically appeared in stage plays as well as hosting her own television series in 1951.

Harrison and Palmer appeared together in the hit Broadway play Bell, Book and Candle in the early 1950s. They also appeared in the 1951 British melodrama The Long Dark Hall, and later starred in the film version of The Four Poster (1952), which was based on the award-winning Broadway play of the same name, written by Jan de Hartog. She won the Volpi Cup for Best Actress in 1953 for The Four Poster.

Harrison and Palmer divorced in 1956; they had one son, Carey, born in 1944.

Palmer returned to Germany in 1954, where she played roles in many films and television productions. She also continued to play both leading and supporting parts in the U.S. and abroad. In 1957, she won the Deutscher Filmpreis for Best Actress for her portrayal of Anna Anderson in The Story of Anastasia, called Is Anna Anderson Anastasia? in the UK. In 1958, she played the role of a teacher opposite Romy Schneider in Mädchen in Uniform (Girls in Uniform), the remake of the 1931 film of the same title.

Palmer starred with Fred Astaire and Debbie Reynolds in The Pleasure of His Company in 1961.

She starred opposite William Holden in The Counterfeit Traitor (1962), an espionage thriller based on fact, and opposite Robert Taylor in another true Second World War story, Disney's Miracle of the White Stallions (1963). On the small screen, in 1974 she starred as Manouche Roget in the six-part television drama series The Zoo Gang, about a group of former underground freedom fighters from the Second World War, with Brian Keith, Sir John Mills and Barry Morse.

Palmer published a memoir, Change Lobsters and Dance, in 1975. Reminiscences by Vivian Matalon and Noël Coward (Matalon directed Palmer in the premiere production of Coward's trilogy Suite in Three Keys in 1966) suggest that Palmer was not always the patient and reasonable person she represented herself as being in this autobiography. She wrote a full-length work of fiction presented as a novel rather than a memoir, The Red Raven, in 1978.

Personal life
Palmer's first marriage was to Rex Harrison in 1943. They divorced amicably in 1957, so that he could marry ailing actress Kay Kendall before her untimely death. Palmer agreed since she was already involved with her future husband, Carlos Thompson.

Palmer was married to Argentine actor Carlos Thompson from 1957 until her death in Los Angeles from abdominal cancer in 1986 at the age of 71. She was survived by her husband, son, sisters, and her ex-husband.

Palmer is interred at Forest Lawn Memorial Park, Glendale, California. A portion of the ashes of her first husband, Rex Harrison, were scattered on her grave.

Accolades
 1953: Volpi Cup for Best Actress for The Four Poster
 1956: Deutscher Filmpreis (Silver) for Best Actress in Teufel in Seide
 1957: Deutscher Filmpreis (Silver) for Best Actress in Anastasia, die letzte Zarentochter
 1959: Golden Globe Award for Best Actress – Motion Picture Musical or Comedy nomination for But Not for Me
 1972: Goldene Kamera for Eine Frau bleibt eine Frau (ZDF TV)
 Star on the Hollywood Walk of Fame at 7013 Hollywood Blvd.
 1974: Great Cross of Merit of the Federal Republic of Germany (Großes Verdienstkreuz der Bundesrepublik Deutschland)
 1978: Deutscher Filmpreis (Gold) for Lifetime Achievement
 1986: Golden Globe Award for Best Supporting Actress – Series, Miniseries or Television Film nomination for Peter the Great

Filmography

Film

Television

Radio appearances

References

Bibliography

Further reading

Palmer, Lilli. Change Lobsters and Dance: An Autobiography. New York: Macmillan, 1975.

External links

 
 
 
 Photographs and literature

1914 births
1986 deaths
German film actresses
Actresses from Berlin
German television actresses
Commanders Crosses of the Order of Merit of the Federal Republic of Germany
Jewish German actresses
Jewish emigrants from Nazi Germany to the United States
Burials at Forest Lawn Memorial Park (Glendale)
People from the Province of Posen
Actors from Poznań
Deaths from cancer in California
Volpi Cup for Best Actress winners
20th-century German actresses
20th-century German women writers
20th-century German non-fiction writers
Jewish writers
Jewish women writers